The Russell Prize (Russell Prize for Humour Writing) is an Australian literary prize awarded every second year by the State Library of New South Wales to a humorous book. It was established in 2014 through a donation by Peter Wentworth Russell, "a farmer, businessman and passionate reader". A shortlist of six books is selected and publicly announced before the prize, which comes with a cash award of $10,000.

In 2021 a second category, Humour Writing for Young People, was introduced for a work aimed at the 5–12 age group. Both winners were announced in June 2021.

Russell Prize for Humour Writing

Humour Writing for Young People

References

External links 

 

Australian literary awards
Awards established in 2015
Comedy and humor literary awards